Modern Pentathlon Federation of Kazakhstan (MPFK) (Qazaqstandyq qazirgi bessaıys federatsııasy) is the governing body for the sport of modern pentathlon in Kazakhstan.

References

External links
 

Kazakhstan
Modern pentathlon in Kazakhstan
Modern Pentathlon